World Rowing U23 Championships  is an international rowing regatta organized by FISA (the International Rowing Federation).  Rowers can compete in U23 events until December 31 of the year that they turn 22. The World Rowing U23 Championship is just under a week long and consists of a progression system to advance from heats to finals. The regatta has 22 boat classes, which includes the 8 lightweight boat classes.

History
From 1976 the U23 event was organised as the Nations Cup, independently from FISA. In 2002 it became the World Rowing U23 Regatta, before becoming the Championships from 2005.

Venues

References

External links
 World Rowing website

 
Rowing competitions
Under-23 sports competitions
World youth sports competitions
Recurring sporting events established in 1976
Recurring sporting events established in 2005